Liechtenstein's pine vole (Microtus liechtensteini) is a species of rodent in the family Cricetidae. It is found in central and eastern Europe, from northern Italy through to Austria, Slovenia and Croatia.

References

D.E. Wilson & D.M. Reeder, 2005: Mammal Species of the World: A Taxonomic and Geographic Reference. Third Edition. The Johns Hopkins University Press, Baltimore

Microtus
Mammals described in 1927